Ottavio Crepaldi (born 21 May 1945) is an Italian former racing cyclist. He rode in the 1971 Tour de France.

References

External links
 

1945 births
Living people
Italian male cyclists
Place of birth missing (living people)
Cyclists from the Province of Rovigo
Tour de Suisse stage winners